Papilio microps is a species of swallowtail butterfly from the genus Papilio that is found in Ethiopia and Somalia.

Taxonomy
Papilio microps belongs to an Afrotropical clade called the nireus species group with 15 members.  The pattern is black with green bands and spots and the butterflies, although called swallowtails lack tails with the exception of Papilio charopus and Papilio hornimani.  The clade members are:

Papilio aristophontes Oberthür, 1897
Papilio nireus Linnaeus, 1758
Papilio charopus Westwood, 1843
Papilio chitondensis de Sousa & Fernandes, 1966
Papilio chrapkowskii Suffert, 1904
Papilio chrapkowskoides Storace, 1952
Papilio desmondi van Someren, 1939
Papilio hornimani Distant, 1879
Papilio interjectana Vane-Wright, 1995
Papilio manlius Fabricius, 1798
Papilio microps Storace, 1951
Papilio sosia Rothschild & Jordan, 1903
Papilio thuraui Karsch, 1900
Papilio ufipa Carcasson, 1961
Papilio wilsoni Rothschild, 1926

References

microps
Butterflies described in 1951